The 1984 Cal State Fullerton Titans baseball team represented California State University, Fullerton in the 1984 NCAA Division I baseball season. The Titans played their home games at Titan Field. The team was coached by Augie Garrido in his 12th season at Cal State Fullerton.

The Titans won the College World Series, defeating the Texas Longhorns in the championship game.

Roster

Schedule 

! style="background:#FF7F00;color:#004a80;"| Regular Season
|- valign="top" 

|-  style="text-align:center; background:#dfd;"
| February 3 || at  || 5–4 || 1–0 || –
|-  style="text-align:center; background:#fdd;"
| February 4 || at Stanford || 1–7 || 1–1 || –
|-  style="text-align:center; background:#dfd;"
| February 5 || at Stanford || 7–5 || 2–1 || –
|-  style="text-align:center; background:#dfd;"
| February 7 || at  || 12–3 || 3–1 || –
|-  style="text-align:center; background:#dfd;"
| February 9 ||  || 7–1 || 4–1 || –
|-  style="text-align:center; background:#fdd;"
| February 10 ||  || 1–4 || 4–2 || –
|-  style="text-align:center; background:#fdd;"
| February 11 || Arizona || 7–8 || 4–3 || –
|-  style="text-align:center; background:#dfd;"
| February 11 || Arizona || 5–1 || 5–3 || –
|-  style="text-align:center; background:#fdd;"
| February 13 || at  || 3–5 || 5–4 || –
|-  style="text-align:center; background:#fdd;"
| February 14 ||  || 2–5 || 5–5 || –
|-  style="text-align:center; background:#dfd;"
| February 16 || at Arizona || 4–1 || 6–5 || –
|-  style="text-align:center; background:#dfd;"
| February 17 || at Arizona || 15–3 || 7–5 || –
|-  style="text-align:center; background:#dfd;"
| February 18 || at Arizona || 13–6 || 8–5 || –
|-  style="text-align:center; background:#dfd;"
| February 21 ||  || 6–5 || 9–5 || –
|-  style="text-align:center; background:#fdd;"
| February 21 ||  || 6–10 || 9–6 || –
|-  style="text-align:center; background:#dfd;"
| February 22 || at UCLA || 16–1 || 10–6 || –
|-  style="text-align:center; background:#dfd;"
| February 23 || Cal Poly Pomona || 17–5 || 11–6 || –
|-  style="text-align:center; background:#dfd;"
| February 24 ||  || 4–2 || 12–6 || –
|-  style="text-align:center; background:#dfd;"
| February 25 || Fresno State || 3–2 || 13–6 || –
|-  style="text-align:center; background:#dfd;"
| February 26 || Fresno State || 5–3 || 14–6 || –
|-  style="text-align:center; background:#dfd;"
| February 28 ||  || 4–3 || 15–6 || –
|-  style="text-align:center; background:#dfd;"
| February 29 ||  || 9–4 || 16–6 || –
|-

|-  style="text-align:center; background:#dfd;"
| March 2 || at Texas || 10–2 || 17–6 || –
|-  style="text-align:center; background:#fdd;"
| March 2 || at Texas || 2–4 || 17–7 || –
|-  style="text-align:center; background:#fdd;"
| March 3 || at Texas || 3–8 || 17–8 || –
|-  style="text-align:center; background:#dfd;"
| March 5 || Southern California || 2–1 || 18–8 || –
|-  style="text-align:center; background:#dfd;"
| March 8 ||  || 9–7 || 19–8 || –
|-  style="text-align:center; background:#dfd;"
| March 9 ||  || 5–3 || 20–8 || –
|-  style="text-align:center; background:#dfd;"
| March 10 || Florida State || 6–1 || 21–8 || –
|-  style="text-align:center; background:#fdd;"
| March 11 || Florida State || 4–10 || 21–9 || –
|-  style="text-align:center; background:#dfd;"
| March 13 || at  || 5–2 || 22–9 || 1–0
|-  style="text-align:center; background:#dfd;"
| March 14 || UC Riverside || 10–1 || 23–9 || –
|-  style="text-align:center; background:#fdd;"
| March 16 || at Pepperdine || 2–4 || 23–10 || 1–1
|-  style="text-align:center; background:#dfd;"
| March 17 || Pepperdine || 8–5 || 24–10 || 2–1
|-  style="text-align:center; background:#fdd;"
| March 17 || Pepperdine || 4–5 || 24–11 || 2–2
|-  style="text-align:center; background:#dfd;"
| March 20 || at  || 11–6 || 25–11 || –
|-  style="text-align:center; background:#dfd;"
| March 21 ||  || 5–2 || 26–11 || –
|-  style="text-align:center; background:#dfd;"
| March 23 || at  || 6–4 || 27–11 || 3–2
|-  style="text-align:center; background:#dfd;"
| March 23 || at UNLV || 6–4 || 28–11 || 4–2
|-  style="text-align:center; background:#fdd;"
| March 24 || at UNLV || 5–7 || 28–12 || 4–3
|-  style="text-align:center; background:#dfd;"
| March 24 || at UNLV || 4–2 || 29–12 || 5–2
|-  style="text-align:center; background:#fdd;"
| March 26 || at UC Riverside || 2–6 || 29–13 || –
|-  style="text-align:center; background:#fdd;"
| March 27 || vs.  || 0–4 || 29–14 || –
|-  style="text-align:center; background:#fdd;"
| March 27 || vs.  || 2–7 || 29–15 || –
|-  style="text-align:center; background:#dfd;"
| March 28 || vs.  || 14–5 || 30–15 || –
|-  style="text-align:center; background:#dfd;"
| March 29 || vs.  || 7–3 || 31–15 || –
|-  style="text-align:center; background:#dfd;"
| March 30 || vs.  || 5–4 || 32–15 || –
|-  style="text-align:center; background:#dfd;"
| March 31 || vs.  || 11–4 || 33–15 || –
|-

|-  style="text-align:center; background:#dfd;"
| April 3 || at  || 4–3 || 34–15 || 6–2
|-  style="text-align:center; background:#dfd;"
| April 4 || at Azusa Pacific || 6–5 || 35–15 || 7–2
|-  style="text-align:center; background:#dfd;"
| April 6 || at  || 8–3 || 36–15 || 8–2
|-  style="text-align:center; background:#dfd;"
| April 7 || San Diego || 13–2 || 37–15 || 9–2
|-  style="text-align:center; background:#dfd;"
| April 7 || San Diego || 7–1 || 38–15 || 10–2
|-  style="text-align:center; background:#dfd;"
| April 10 || at  || 13–5 || 39–15 || 11–2
|-  style="text-align:center; background:#dfd;"
| April 11 || La Verne || 11–2 || 40–15 || –
|-  style="text-align:center; background:#dfd;"
| April 13 ||  || 3–0 || 41–15 || –
|-  style="text-align:center; background:#dfd;"
| April 15 || Cal Poly || 18–4 || 42–15 || –
|-  style="text-align:center; background:#dfd;"
| April 20 ||  || 12–9 || 43–15 || 12–2
|-  style="text-align:center; background:#fdd;"
| April 21 || at Loyola Marymount || 3–7 || 43–16 || 12–3
|-  style="text-align:center; background:#dfd;"
| April 21 || at Loyola Marymount || 14–3 || 44–16 || 13–3
|-  style="text-align:center; background:#dfd;"
| April 24 ||  || 6–1 || 45–16 || 14–3
|-  style="text-align:center; background:#dfd;"
| April 25 ||  || 16–0 || 46–16 || –
|-  style="text-align:center; background:#dfd;"
| April 27 || at UC Irvine || 6–2 || 47–16 || 15–3
|-  style="text-align:center; background:#fdd;"
| April 28 || UC Irvine || 3–5 || 47–17 || 15–4
|-  style="text-align:center; background:#dfd;"
| April 28 || UC Irvine || 3–0 || 48–17 || 16–4
|-

|-  style="text-align:center; background:#dfd;"
| May 1 || Loyola Marymount || 6–0 || 49–17 || 17–4
|-  style="text-align:center; background:#dfd;"
| May 4 || Long Beach State || 12–4 || 50–17 || 18–4
|-  style="text-align:center; background:#dfd;"
| May 5 || at Long Beach State || 4–3 || 51–17 || 19–4
|-  style="text-align:center; background:#fdd;"
| May 5 || at Long Beach State || 3–4 || 51–18 || 19–5
|-  style="text-align:center; background:#dfd;"
| May 8 || at San Diego || 5–3 || 52–18 || 19–6
|-  style="text-align:center; background:#dfd;"
| May 11 || at UC Santa Barbara || 14–8 || 53–18 || 20–6
|-  style="text-align:center; background:#dfd;"
| May 12 || UC Santa Barbara || 15–13 || 54–18 || 21–6
|-  style="text-align:center; background:#dfd;"
| May 12 || UC Santa Barbara || 6–0 || 55–18 || 22–6
|-  style="text-align:center; background:#dfd;"
| May 19 || UNLV || 9–3 || 56–18 || –
|-  style="text-align:center; background:#dfd;"
| May 19 || UNLV || 7–3 || 57–18 || –
|-  style="text-align:center; background:#dfd;"
| May 20 || UNLV || 9–7 || 58–18 || –
|-

|-
! style="background:#FF7F00;color:#004a80;"| Post–Season
|-
|-

|-  style="text-align:center; background:#dfd;"
| May 25 || vs. Southern California || Pete Beiden Field || 10–6 || Simmons (W; 14–2) || – || 59–18
|-  style="text-align:center; background:#dfd;"
| May 26 || vs. San Diego State || Pete Beiden Field || 16–6 || Reinholtz (W; 12–2) || 1,752 || 60–18
|-  style="text-align:center; background:#fdd;"
| May 27 || vs. San Diego State || Pete Beiden Field || 5–9 || Mathews (L; 9-4) || 1,643 || 60–19
|-  style="text-align:center; background:#dfd;"
| May 28 || vs. San Diego State || Pete Beiden Field || 8–7 || Wright (W; 5–1) || 1,368 || 61–19
|-

|-  style="text-align:center; background:#dfd;"
| June 1 || vs. Michigan || Rosenblatt Stadium || 8–4 || Wright (W; 6–1) || 10,274 || 62–19
|-  style="text-align:center; background:#fdd;"
| June 4 || vs. Texas || Rosenblatt Stadium || 4–6 || Simmons (L; 14–3) || 9,514 || 62–20
|-  style="text-align:center; background:#dfd;"
| June 6 || vs. Miami (FL) || Rosenblatt Stadium || 13–5 || Delzer (W; 7–2) || 5,000 || 63–20
|-  style="text-align:center; background:#dfd;"
| June 8 || vs. Arizona State || Rosenblatt Stadium || 6–1 || Reinholtz (W; 13–2) || 9,000 || 64–20
|-  style="text-align:center; background:#dfd;"
| June 9 || vs. Oklahoma State || Rosenblatt Stadium || 10–2 || Simmons (W; 15–3) || 9,931 || 65–20
|-  style="text-align:center; background:#dfd;"
| June 10 || vs. Texas || Rosenblatt Stadium || 3–1 || Delzer (W; 8–2) || 13,487 || 66–20
|-

Awards and honors 
Kirk Bates
 All-SCBA First Team

Bob Caffrey
 All-SCBA First Team
 College World Series All-Tournament Team

Eddie Delzer
 College World Series All-Tournament Team

John Fishel
 College World Series Most Outstanding Player
 College World Series All-Tournament Team
 All-America Second Team
 All-SCBA First Team

Blaine Larker
 College World Series All-Tournament Team

Jose Mota
 All-SCBA First Team

Todd Simmons
 All-America First Team
 All-SCBA First Team

Tom Thomas
 All-SCBA First Team

Scott Wright
 All-America First Team
 SCBA Player of the Year
 All-SCBA First Team

Titans in the 1984 MLB Draft 
The following members of the Cal State Fullerton Titans baseball program were drafted in the 1984 Major League Baseball Draft.

References 

Cal State Fullerton Titans baseball seasons
Cal State Fullerton
College World Series seasons
NCAA Division I Baseball Championship seasons
Fullerton Titans